Grant O'Riley (born 21 January 1960) is a former Australian rules footballer who played for Fitzroy in the Victorian Football League (VFL) during the 1980s.

After making his league debut late in the 1982 season, against Collingwood at Waverley Park, O'Riley made two further appearances that year. Under the coaching of Robert Walls, Fitzroy made the finals in 1983, having narrowly missed out the previous season, but O'Riley was not to feature despite participating in three wins earlier in their campaign.

O'Riley later played at Port Melbourne and represented the VFA representative team in the 1988 Adelaide Bicentennial Carnival.

References

Holmesby, Russell and Main, Jim (2007). The Encyclopedia of AFL Footballers. 7th ed. Melbourne: Bas Publishing.

1960 births
Living people
Fitzroy Football Club players
Port Melbourne Football Club players
Australian rules footballers from Victoria (Australia)